The men's long jump at the 1950 European Athletics Championships was held in Brussels, Belgium, at Heysel Stadium on 25 and 26 August 1950.

Medalists

Results

Final
26 August

Qualification
25 August

Participation
According to an unofficial count, 17 athletes from 12 countries participated in the event.

 (1)
 (2)
 (1)
 (2)
 (1)
 (1)
 (2)
 (1)
 (1)
 (2)
 (2)
 (1)

References

Long jump
Long jump at the European Athletics Championships